Lamprotes is a genus of moths of the family Noctuidae.

Species
 Lamprotes c-aureum Knoch, 1781
 Lamprotes mikadina Butler, 1878

References
 Lamprotes at funet.fi
 Natural History Museum Lepidoptera genus database

Plusiinae